The Marina Pinnacle is a 77-floor tower in the Dubai Marina in Dubai, United Arab Emirates. The tower has a total structural height of 280 m (853 ft) and 764 residential and commercial units. Construction of the Marina Pinnacle was completed in 2011. 

The tower topped out in December, 2010 with 96% completion and became 19th tallest building in Dubai. Handover process is started in July 2011 and it is still in progress.

See also 
 List of tallest buildings in Dubai
 List of tallest buildings in the United Arab Emirates

References

External links

Emporis

Residential skyscrapers in Dubai
High-tech architecture
Postmodern architecture